Boáz Klartag (born 25 April 1978) is an Israeli mathematician. He currently is a professor at the Weizmann Institute, and prior to that he was a professor at the Department of Pure Mathematics of Tel Aviv University, where he earned his doctorate under the supervision of Vitali Milman. Klartag made contributions in asymptotic geometric analysis and won the 2008 EMS Prize, as well as the 2010 Erdős Prize. He is an editor of the Journal d'Analyse Mathématique.

Selected works

References

External links

1978 births
Living people
21st-century Israeli mathematicians
Tel Aviv University alumni
International Mathematical Olympiad participants
Erdős Prize recipients